is the 3rd major-label single by the Japanese female idol group Momoiro Clover, released in Japan on March 9, 2011. It was the last to feature former member Hayami Akari.

Track listing

Limited Editions A, B

Regular Edition

Chart performance

References

External links 
 CD single details on the official site
 Power Push - Momoiro Clover - Natalie

2011 singles
Momoiro Clover Z songs
King Records (Japan) singles
Japanese-language songs
2011 songs